Michael L. Chyet (born 1957) is an American linguist.

He is a cataloguer of Middle Eastern languages at the Library of Congress. Formerly he was senior editor of the Kurdish Service of the Voice of America and professor of Kurdish at the University of Paris and at the Washington Kurdish Institute.

He has written a Kurdish-English dictionary. He is a skillful linguist who is fluent in several Middle Eastern languages, including Arabic, Hebrew, Persian, Turkish and at least two dialects of Kurdish, both Sorani and Kurmanji, in addition to several other European languages.

External links
 Kurdish-English Dictionary by Michael L. Chyet

Linguists from the United States
Linguists of Kurdish
Kurdish language
American lexicographers
Academic staff of the University of Paris
Language teachers
1957 births
Living people